Robert S. Biscup (born June 4, 1952) is an American orthopaedic surgeon.
 
Biscup's work includes developments in major reconstructive spine surgery, failed spine surgery, and minimally invasive spine surgery, including laser microsurgery and micro-decompression laminoplasty. Biscup lectures frequently in Florida and around the world.

Background
Robert S. Biscup was born in Cleveland, Ohio to George and Betty Biscup.  He grew up in Cleveland, where at age 10 he began to play the accordion, piano, and organ. He played professionally to help pay for his college education at Hiram College, where he received a Bachelor of Arts Degree in 1967. Dr. Biscup graduated cum laude with Departmental Honors in Chemistry from Hiram College with a Bachelor of Arts degree. Biscup also earned a Master of Science in Health Sciences Education at Case Western Reserve University and completed his Doctor of Osteopathic Medicine degree (D.O.) at the Ohio University College of Osteopathic Medicine in 1980.

Career
A former president and current member of the American Osteopathic Academy of Orthopaedics, Biscup has won several awards, including the patient advocacy award from the American Academy of Pain Management; the Outstanding Educator Award from Cleveland Clinic's Orthopaedic Residency Training Program; two Medal of Merit Awards from the Ohio University's College of Osteopathic Medicine.

Biscup has traveled extensively in the United States and Europe teaching and demonstrating instrumentation, minimally invasive surgery and implants that he helped develop. Biscup has given over 100 lectures at professional meetings worldwide and in the U.S.  Biscup continues to serve as the Senior Examiner for the American Osteopathic Board of Orthopedic Surgery. He has been Orthopedic consultant for the Cleveland Indians, Clinical Professor in Orthopedic Surgery at the Ohio University College of Osteopathic Medicine, and has served in several capacities at the Cleveland Clinic including Director of the Regional Spine Care Program and Chairman of the Cleveland Clinic Florida Spine Institute.

Publications
Additionally, Biscup has published numerous medical articles.

Partial list:
"Assessment of Internet Use and Effects Among Healthcare Professionals: A Cross Sectional Survey. Neurotrauma", (November 2006) Postgraduate Medical Journal. 
"Complications Associated With Minimally Invasive Decompression For Lumbar Spinal Stenosis.” (August 2006) Journal of Spinal Disorders & Techniques. 
“Evaluation of Cold Therapy in Postoperative Spine Patients.” (May 2005) Surgical Technology International. 
“Chronic Non-malignant Musculoskeletal Pain in Older Adults: Clinical Issues and Opioid Intervention.” (February 2004) Postgraduate Medical Journal. 
“Seven-year Follow-up of Vertebral Excision and Reconstruction for Malignant Hemangioendothelioma of Bone.” (May 1995) Spine. 
“Posterior Transvertebral Osteotomy for Adult Thoracolumbar Kyphosis.” (February 1995) Spine. 
“Reduction of High-grade Slips (grades III-V) With VSP Instrumentation. Report of a Series of 41 Cases.” (August 1991) Spine. 
“Segmental Spine Plates with Pedicle Screw Fixation. A New Internal Fixation Device for Disorders Of The Lumbar And Thoracolumbar Spine.” (April 1986) Clinical Orthopaedics and Related Research.

References

External links
The Biscup Spine Institute homepage

1952 births
American osteopathic physicians
Case Western Reserve University alumni
Hiram College alumni
Living people
Ohio University alumni
American orthopedic surgeons